Contumazá may refer to:
Contumazá, a city in northern Peru.
Contumazá District, a district in the Contumazá Province.
Contumazá Province, a province in northern Peru.